Michel Lauzière (born 1954) is a Canadian comedian known for his bizarre visual standup acts. Lauziere began performing in 1975 in a duo called les foubrac. Since then Lauziere has performed his one-man show to an estimated 1 billion viewers on five continents.

One famous performance was done for the Late Show with David Letterman. Lauziere rollerbladed through a closed street, playing Georges Bizet's Toreador Song on tuned wine bottles. Lauziere had a recurring role on the Super Dave Osborne Show and he also performed on the 2007 Jerry Lewis MDA Telethon.

References

External links
michellauziere.com

French audio/bio interview with Michel Lauzière for "Les Baladodiffusions DuBon et DuCon" by Serge Lemire, in January 2007.

Living people
1954 births
Canadian stand-up comedians